

Religion
Āgama (Buddhism), a collection of Early Buddhist texts
Āgama (Hinduism), scriptures of several Hindu sects
Jain literature (Jain Āgamas), various canonical scriptures in Jainism

Other uses
 Agama (lizard), a genus of lizards in the family Agamidae
 Agama agama, a species of lizard from the family Agamidae
 Religion, referred to as agama in the Malay-speaking world (Indonesia, Malaysia, Singapore, Brunei)
 Parthenogenesis or agamic, a form of asexual reproduction not involving the fusion of male and female gametes

See also
 Agam (disambiguation)